James Evans is a Welsh Conservative Party politician, who has served as the Member of the Senedd (MS) for Brecon and Radnorshire since the 2021 Senedd election. He won the seat from the Welsh Liberal Democrats, becoming the first MS for this constituency from the Welsh Conservative Party.

James Evans had been elected to Powys County Council in 2017, representing the Gwernyfed ward and was Cabinet Member for Economic Development, Housing & Regulatory Services.

References

Year of birth missing (living people)
Living people
Conservative Party members of the Senedd
Wales MSs 2021–2026